Chivalry & Sorcery Sourcebook is a 1978 role-playing game supplement for Chivalry & Sorcery by Edward E. Simbalist and Wilf K. Backhaus, published by Fantasy Games Unlimited.

Contents
Chivalry & Sorcery Sourcebook introduces new characters classes and presents treatises on medieval hunting, economics, trade, military mobilization, medicine, and theories of magic.

Reception
Ronald Pehr reviewed Chivalry & Sorcery Sourcebook in The Space Gamer No. 44. Pehr commented that "If you don't play C&S, don't want to, and are uninterested in the background of fantasy adventures, you won't like Sourcebook.  But, if you've played C&S, or might, or just want to see how to build a dream world (and furnish it, and move in first of the month), risk the sawbuck.  Buy this book."

References

Reviews
Casus Belli (Issue 5 - Sep 1981)

Chivalry & Sorcery
Fantasy role-playing game supplements
Role-playing game supplements introduced in 1978